The 2017 Mazda Road to Indy Shootout was the second edition of the Road to Indy Shootout. The event was held at Wild Horse Pass Motorsports Park on December 9 and 10. The winner, Irishman Keith Donegan, received a $200,000 scholarship to compete in the 2018 U.S. F2000 National Championship.

Entry list

Notes
 Karting news website eKartingnews.com chief editor Rob Howden and managing editor David Cole selected Jake Craig as up and coming talent. He was selected to compete in the 2017 Mazda Road to Indy Shootout. Craig was selected out of a short list of finalists, namely Jake French, Brandon Jarsocrak, Braden Eves, Ryan Norberg and Billy Musgrave.

 Williams won the FormulaSPEED championship, the fastest of the three Formula Car Challenge West Coast and Triple Crown championships.

 iZone Driver Performance hosted a sim racing shootout. Drivers who were nominated for Quantum Racing Suspension Driver of the Race in Formula Ford 1600 races organised by James Beckett Motorsport or MSVR were selected. These drivers were Jack Kemp, Ross Martin, Seb Melrose, James Roe Jr. and Jamie Thorburn. Oliver White also qualified for the shootout but he chose not to compete as he already qualified for the 2017 Mazda Road to Indy Shootout. Irish driver Niall Murray also opted not to participate.

 Michael Moyers won the 2017 Walter Hayes Trophy but did not qualify for the Mazda Road to Indy Shootout due to his age (33). As 24-year old Oliver White led most of the race but spun off with 2 laps to go, he was awarded a wildcard entry into the Mazda Road to Indy Shootout.

 Jonathan Kotyk and Aaron Jeansonne were selected to represent Team USA Scholarship at the Formula Ford Festival, Walter Hayes Trophy and 2017 Mazda Road to Indy Shootout. The duo was chosen out of ten candidates, Sabré Cook, Konrad Czaczyk, Elliot Finlayson, Kyle Kirkwood, Jacob Loomis, David Osborne, Simon Sikes and Carter Williams did not advance into the final selection.

Format

The Bob Bondurant School of High Performance Driving supplied the drivers with first generation Formula Mazda chassis. The tube chassis cars are powered by 180hp rotary engines. The shootout location, Wild Horse Pass Motorsports Park is also the location of the racing school founded by Bob Bondurant.

References

2017
2017 in IndyCar
U.S. F2000 National Championship seasons